The 1955 Commonwealth Prime Ministers' Conference was the seventh Meeting of the Heads of Government of the Commonwealth of Nations. It was held in the United Kingdom in January 1955 and was hosted by that country's Prime Minister, Sir Winston Churchill.

A sense of international crisis loomed over the conference which occurred during which the First Taiwan Strait Crisis as were other international developments such as the sudden resignation of Soviet Premier Georgy Malenkov and the fall of French prime minister Pierre Mendès France, all of which were discussed. Atomic energy for peaceful purposes, disarmament, and trade and economic development in the Sterling area, and regional defence were also discussed, in particular the defence of South East Asia, the formation of SEATO and in particular the ongoing insurgency in Malaya.

Pakistan informed the meeting that it was to become a republic and the meeting affirmed that Pakistan would be welcome to remain in the Commonwealth.

Participants

References

1955
Diplomatic conferences in the United Kingdom
20th-century diplomatic conferences
1955 in international relations
1955 in London
United Kingdom and the Commonwealth of Nations
1955 conferences
January 1955 events in the United Kingdom
February 1955 events in the United Kingdom
1950s in the City of Westminster
Winston Churchill
Robert Menzies
Jawaharlal Nehru